The United Nations Collaborative Programme on "Reducing emissions from deforestation and forest degradation and the role of conservation, sustainable management of forests and enhancement of forest carbon stocks in developing countries (REDD+)" was first negotiated under the United Nations Framework Convention on Climate Change (UNFCCC) in 2005, with the objective of mitigating climate change through reducing net emissions of greenhouse gases through enhanced forest management in developing countries. Most of the key REDD+ decisions were completed by 2013, with the final pieces of the rulebook finished in 2015.

The programme is a collaboration between FAO, UNDP and UNEP under which a trust fund established in July 2008 allows donors to pool resources to generate the requisite transfer flow of resources to significantly reduce global emissions from deforestation and forest degradation.

Since 2000, various studies estimate that land use change, including deforestation and forest degradation, accounts for 12-29% of global greenhouse gas emissions. For this reason the inclusion of reducing emissions from land use change is considered essential to achieve the objectives of the UNFCCC.

During the negotiations for the Kyoto Protocol, and then in particular its Clean Development Mechanism (CDM), the inclusion of tropical forest management was debated but eventually dropped due to anticipated methodological difficulties in establishing – in particular – additionality and leakage (detrimental effects outside of the project area attributable to project activities). What remained on forestry was "Afforestation and Reforestation", sectoral scope 14 of the CDM. Under this sectoral scope areas of land that had no forest cover since 1990 could be replanted with commercial or indigenous tree species. In its first eight years of operation 52 projects had been registered under the "Afforestation and Reforestation" scope of the CDM. The cumbersome administrative procedures and corresponding high transaction costs are often blamed for this slow uptake. Beyond the CDM, all developed countries that were parties to the Kyoto Protocol also committed to measuring and reporting on efforts to reduce net greenhouse gas emissions from forests.

History

REDD 
REDD was first discussed in 2005 by the UNFCCC at its 11th session of the Conference of the Parties to the convention (COP) at the request of Costa Rica and Papua New Guinea, on behalf of the Coalition for Rainforest Nations, when they submitted the document "Reducing Emissions from Deforestation in Developing Countries: Approaches to Stimulate Action", with a request to create an agenda item to discuss consideration of reducing emissions from deforestation and forest degradation in natural forests as a mitigation measure. COP 11 entered the request to consider the document as agenda item 6: Reducing emissions from deforestation in developing countries: approaches to stimulate action.

In December 2007, after a two-year debate on a proposal from Papua New Guinea and Costa Rica, state parties to the United Nations Framework Convention on Climate Change (UNFCCC) agreed to explore ways of reducing emissions from deforestation and to enhance forest carbon stocks in developing nations. The underlying idea is that developing nations should be financially compensated if they succeed in reducing their levels of deforestation (through valuing the carbon that is stored in forests); a concept termed 'avoided deforestation (AD) or, REDD if broadened to include reducing forest degradation.

Under the free market model advocated by the countries who have formed the Coalition of Rainforest Nations, developing nations with rainforests would sell carbon sink credits under a free market system to Kyoto Protocol Annex I states who have exceeded their emissions allowance. Brazil (the state with the largest area of tropical rainforest) however, opposes including avoided deforestation in a carbon trading mechanism and instead favors creation of a multilateral development assistance fund created from donations by developed states. For REDD to be successful science and regulatory infrastructure related to forests will need to increase so nations may inventory all their forest carbon, show that they can control land use at the local level and prove that their emissions are declining.

REDD+ 
Subsequent to the initial donor nation response, the UN established REDD Plus, or REDD+, expanding the original program's scope to include increasing forest cover through both reforestation and the planting of new forest cover, as well as promoting sustainable forest resource management.

Bali Action Plan 
REDD received substantial attention from the UNFCCC – and the attending community – at COP 13, December 2007, where the first substantial decision on REDD+ was adopted, Decision 2/CP.13: "Reducing emissions from deforestation in developing countries: approaches to stimulate action", calling for demonstration activities to be reported upon two years later and assessment of drivers of deforestation. REDD+ was also referenced in decision 1/CP.13, the "Bali Action Plan", with reference to all five eligible activities for REDD+ (with sustainable management of forests, conservation of forest carbon stocks and enhancement of forest carbon stocks constituting the "+" in REDD+).

The call for demonstration activities in decision 2/CP.13 led to a very large number of programs and projects, including the Forest Carbon Partnership Facility (FCPF) of the World Bank, the UN-REDD Programme, and a number of smaller projects financed by the Norwegian International Climate and Forest Initiative (NICFI), the United States, the United Kingdom, and Germany, among many others. All of these were based on substantive guidance from the UNFCCC.

Definition of main elements 
In 2009 at COP 15, decision 4/CP.15: "Methodological guidance for activities relating to reducing emissions from deforestation and forest degradation and the role of conservation, sustainable management of forests and enhancement of forest carbon stocks in developing countries" provided more substantive information on requirements for REDD+. Specifically, the national forest monitoring system was introduced, with elements of measurement, reporting and verification (MRV). Countries were encouraged to develop national strategies, develop domestic capacity, establish reference levels, and establish a participatory approach with "full and effective engagement of indigenous peoples and local communities in (…) monitoring and reporting".

A year later at COP 16 decision 1/CP.16 was adopted. In section C: "Policy approaches and positive incentives on issues relating to reducing emissions from deforestation and forest degradation in developing countries; and the role of conservation, sustainable management of forests and enhancement of forest carbon stocks in developing countries" environmental and social safeguards were introduced, with a reiteration of requirements for the national forest monitoring system. These safeguards were introduced to ensure that implementation of REDD+ at the national level would not lead to detrimental effects for the environment or the local population. Countries are required to provide summaries of information on how these safeguards are implemented throughout the three "phases" of REDD+.

In 2011 decision 12/CP.17 was adopted at COP 17: "Guidance on systems for providing information on how safeguards are addressed and respected and modalities relating to forest reference emission levels and forest reference levels as referred to in decision 1/CP.16". Details are provided on preparation and submission of reference levels and guidance on providing information on safeguards.

Warsaw Framework on REDD-plus 
In December 2013, COP 19 produced no fewer than seven decisions on REDD+, which are jointly known as the "Warsaw Framework on REDD-plus". These decisions address a work program on results-based finance; coordination of support for implementation; modalities for national forest monitoring systems; presenting information on safeguards; technical assessment of reference (emission) levels; modalities for measuring, reporting and verifying (MRV); and information on addressing the drivers of deforestation and forest degradation. Requirements to be eligible access to "results-based finance" have been specified: through submission of reports for which the contents have been specified; technical assessment through International Consultation and Analysis (ICA) for which procedures have been specified. With these decisions the overall framework for REDD+ implementation was completed, although many details still needed to be provided.

COP 20 in December 2014 did not produce any new decisions on REDD+. A reference was made to REDD+ in decision 8/CP.20 "Report of the Green Climate Fund to the Conference of the Parties and guidance to the Green Climate Fund", where in paragraph 18 the COP "requests the Board of the Green Climate Fund (...) (b) to consider decisions relevant to REDD-plus", referring back to earlier COP decisions on REDD+.

The remaining outstanding decisions on REDD+ were completed at COP 21 in 2015. With the conclusion of decisions on reporting on the safeguards, non-market approaches, and non-carbon benefits, the UNFCCC rulebook on REDD+ was completed. All countries were also encouraged to implement and support REDD+ in Article 5 of the Paris Agreement. This was part of a broader Article that specified that all countries should take action to protect and enhance their greenhouse gas sinks and reservoirs (stores of sequestered carbon).

Terminology 
The approach detailed under the UNFCCC is commonly referred to as "reducing emissions from deforestation and forest degradation", abbreviated as REDD+. This title and the acronyms, however, are not used by the COP itself.

The original submission by Papua New Guinea and Costa Rica, on behalf of the Coalition for Rainforest Nations, dated 28 July 2005, was entitled "Reducing Emissions from Deforestation in Developing Countries: Approaches to Stimulate Action". COP 11 entered the request to consider the document as agenda item 6: "Reducing emissions from deforestation in developing countries: approaches to stimulate action", again written here exactly as in the official text. The name for the agenda item was also used at COP 13 in Bali, December 2007. By COP 15 in Copenhagen, December 2009, the scope of the agenda item was broadened to "Methodological guidance for activities relating to reducing emissions from deforestation and forest degradation and the role of conservation, sustainable management of forests and enhancement of forest carbon stocks in developing countries", moving to "Policy approaches and positive incentives on issues relating to reducing emissions from deforestation and forest degradation in developing countries; and the role of conservation, sustainable management of forests and enhancement of forest carbon stocks in developing countries" by COP 16. At COP 17 the title of the decision simply referred back to an earlier decision: "Guidance on systems for providing information on how safeguards are addressed and respected and modalities relating to forest reference emission levels and forest reference levels as referred to in decision 1/CP.16". At COP 19 the titles of decisions 9 and 12 refer back to decision 1/CP.16, paragraph 70 and appendix I respectively, while the other decisions only mention the topic under consideration.

None of these decisions use an acronym for the title of the agenda item; the acronym is not coined by the COP of the UNFCCC. The set of decisions on REDD+ that were adopted at COP 19 in Warsaw, December 2013, was coined the Warsaw Framework on REDD-plus in a footnote to the title of each of the decisions creating the acronyms:

 REDD originally referred to "reducing emissions from deforestation in developing countries" the title of the original document on REDD It was superseded in the negotiations by REDD+.
 REDD+ (or REDD-plus) refers to "reducing emissions from deforestation and forest degradation in developing countries, and the role of conservation, sustainable management of forests, and enhancement of forest carbon stocks in developing countries" (emphasis added); the most recent, elaborated terminology used by the COP

Main elements of REDD+ 

As an approach under the multi-lateral climate change agreement, REDD+ is essentially a vehicle to encourage developing countries to reduce emissions and enhance removals of greenhouse gases through a variety of forest management options, and to provide technical and financial support for these efforts. As with other approaches under the UNFCCC, there are few prescriptions that specifically mandate how to implement the mechanism at national level; the principles of national sovereignty and subsidiarity imply that the UNFCCC can only provide guidelines for implementation, and require that reports are submitted in a certain format and open for review by the convention. There are certain aspects that go beyond this basic philosophy – such as the so-called safeguards, explained in more detail below – but in essence REDD+ is no more than a set of guidelines on how to report on forest resources and forest management strategies and their results in terms of reducing emissions and enhancing removals of greenhouse gases. However, a set of requirements has been elaborated to ensure that REDD+ programs contain key elements and that reports from Parties are consistent and comparable and that their content are open to review and in function of the objectives of the convention.

Decision 1/CP.16 requests all developing countries aiming to undertake REDD+ to develop the following elements:
(a) A national strategy or action plan;
(b) A national forest reference emission level and/or forest reference level or, if appropriate, as an interim measure, subnational forest reference emission levels and/or forest reference levels;
(c) A robust and transparent national forest monitoring system for the monitoring and reporting on REDD+ activities (see below), with, if appropriate, subnational monitoring and reporting as an interim measure;
(d) A system for providing information on how the social and environmental safeguards (included in an appendix to the decision) are being addressed and respected throughout the implementation of REDD+.

It further requests developing countries, when developing and implementing their national REDD+ strategies or action plans, to address, among other issues, the drivers of deforestation and forest degradation, land tenure issues, forest governance issues, gender considerations and the social and environmental safeguards, ensuring the full and effective participation of relevant stakeholders, inter alia indigenous peoples and local communities.

Policies and measures 
In the text of the convention repeated reference is made to national "policies and measures", the set of legal, regulatory and administrative instruments that parties develop and implement to achieve the objective of the convention. These policies can be specific to climate change mitigation or adaptation, or of a more generic nature but with an impact on greenhouse gas emissions. Many of the signatory parties to the UNFCCC have by now established climate change strategies and response measures.

The REDD+ approach has a similar, more focused set of policies and measures. Forest sector laws and procedures are typically in place in most countries. In addition, countries have to develop specific national strategies and/or action plans for REDD+.

Of specific interest to REDD+ are the drivers of deforestation and forest degradation. The UNFCCC decisions call on countries to make an assessment of these drivers and to base the policies and measures on this assessment, such that the policies and measures can be directed to where the impact is greatest. Some of the drivers will be generic – in the sense that they are prevalent in many countries, such as increasing population pressure – while others will be very specific to countries or regions within countries.

Countries are encouraged to identify "national circumstances" that impact the drivers: specific conditions within the country that impact the forest resources. Hints for typical national circumstances can be found in preambles to various COP decisions, such as "Reaffirming that economic and social development and poverty eradication are global priorities" in the Bali Action Plan, enabling developing countries to prioritize policies like poverty eradication through agricultural expansion or hydropower development over forest protection.

Eligible activities 
The decisions on REDD+ enumerate five "eligible activities" that developing countries may implement to reduce emissions and enhance removals of greenhouse gases:
(a) Reducing emissions from deforestation.
(b) Reducing emissions from forest degradation.
(c) Conservation of forest carbon stocks.
(d) Sustainable management of forests.
(e) Enhancement of forest carbon stocks.

The first two activities reduce emissions of greenhouse gases and they are the two activities listed in the original submission on REDD+ in 2005 by the Coalition for Rainforest Nations. The three remaining activities constitute the "+" in REDD+. The last one enhances removals of greenhouse gases, while the effect of the other two on emissions or removals is indeterminate but expected to be minimal.

Reference levels 

Reference levels are a key component for any national REDD+ program. They serve as a baseline for measuring the success of REDD+ programs in reducing greenhouse gas emissions from forests. They are available for examination by the international community to assess the reported emission reductions or enhanced removals. It establishes the confidence of the international community in the national REDD+ program. The results measured against these baselines may be eligible for results-based payments. Setting the reference levels too lax will erode the confidence in the national REDD+ program, while setting them too strict will erode the potential to earn the benefits with which to operate the national REDD+ program. Careful consideration of all relevant information is therefore of crucial importance.

The requirements and characteristics of reference levels are under the purview of the UNFCCC. Given the wide variety in ecological conditions and country-specific circumstances, these requirements are rather global and every country will have a range of options in its definition of reference levels within its territory.

A reference level (RL) is expressed as an amount, derived by differencing a sequence of amounts over a period of time. For REDD+ purposes the amount is expressed in CO2-equivalents (CO2e) (see article on global warming potential) of emissions or removals per year. If the amounts are emissions, the reference level becomes a reference emission level (REL); however these RELs are seen by some as incomplete as they do not take into account removals. Reference levels are based on a scope ‒ what is included? ‒ a scale ‒ the geographical area from which it is derived or to which it is applied ‒ and a period over which the reference level is calculated. The scope, the scale and the period can be modified in reference to national circumstances: specific conditions in the country that would call for an adjustment of the basis from which the reference levels are constructed. A reference level can be based on observations or measurements of amounts in the past, in which case it is retrospective, or it can be an expectation or projection of amounts into the future, in which case it is prospective.

Reference levels have to eventually have national coverage, but they may be composed from a number of sub-national reference levels. As an example, forest degradation may have a reference emission level for commercial selective logging and one for extraction of minor timber and firewood for subsistence use by rural communities. Effectively, every identified driver of deforestation or forest degradation has to be represented in one or more reference emission level(s). Similarly for reference levels for enhancement of carbon stocks, there may be a reference level for plantation timber species and one for natural regeneration, possibly stratified by ecological region or forest type.

Details on the reporting and technical assessment of reference levels are given in Decision 13/CP.19.

Monitoring: measurement, reporting and verification 
In Decision 2/CP.15 of the UNFCCC countries are requested to develop national forest monitoring systems (NFMS) that support the functions of measurement, reporting and verification (MRV) of actions and achievements of the implementation of REDD+ activities. NFMS is the key component in the management of information for national REDD+ programs. A fully functional monitoring system can go beyond the requirements posted by the UNFCCC to include issues such as a registry of projects and participants, and evaluation of program achievements and policy effectiveness. It may be purpose-built, but it may also be integrated into existing forest monitoring tools.

Measurements are suggested to be made using a combination of remote sensing and ground-based observations. Remote sensing is particularly suited to the assessment of areas of forest and stratification of different forest types. Ground-based observations involve forest surveys to measure the carbon pools used by the Intergovernmental Panel on Climate Change (IPCC), the United Nations body for assessing the science related to climate change,  as well as other parameters of interest such as those related to safeguards and eligible activity implementation.

The reporting has to follow the IPCC guidance, in particular the "Good Practice Guidance for Land use, land-use change, and forestry". This provides reporting templates to be included in National Communications of Parties to the UNFCCC. Also included in the guidance are standard measurements protocols and analysis procedures that greatly impact the measurement systems that countries need to establish. The actual reporting of REDD+ results goes through the Biennial Update Reports (BURs), instead of the National Communications of Parties. 

The technical assessment of these results is an independent, external process that is managed by the Secretariat to the UNFCCC; countries need to facilitate the requirements of this assessment. The technical assessment is included within the broader process of International Consultation and Analysis (ICA), which is effectively a peer-review by a team composed of an expert from an Annex I Party and an expert from a non-Annex I Party which "will be conducted in a manner that is nonintrusive, non-punitive and respectful of national sovereignty". This "technical team of experts shall analyse the extent to which:

(a) There is consistency in methodologies, definitions, comprehensiveness and the information provided between the assessed reference level and the results of the implementation of the [REDD+] activities (...);
(b) The data and information provided in the technical annex is transparent, consistent, complete and accurate;
(c) The data and information provided in the technical annex is consistent with the [UNFCCC] guidelines (...);
(d) The results are accurate, to the extent possible."

However, unlike a true verification the technical assessment cannot "approve" or "reject" the reference level, or the reported results measured against this reference level. It does provide clarity on potential areas for improvement.

Financing entities that seek to provide results-based payments (payments per tonne of mitigation achieved) typically seek a true verification of results by external experts, to provide assurance that the results for which they are paying are credible.

Safeguards 

In response to concerns over the potential for negative consequences resulting from the implementation of REDD+ the UNFCCC established a list of safeguards that countries need to "address and respect" and "promote and support" in order to guarantee the correct and lasting generation of results from the REDD+ mechanism. These safeguards are:
"(a)	That actions complement or are consistent with the objectives of national forest programmes and relevant international conventions and agreements;
(b)	Transparent and effective national forest governance structures, taking into account national legislation and sovereignty;
(c)	Respect for the knowledge and rights of indigenous peoples and members of local communities, by taking into account relevant international obligations, national circumstances and laws, and noting that the United Nations General Assembly has adopted the United Nations Declaration on the Rights of Indigenous Peoples;
(d)	The full and effective participation of relevant stakeholders, in particular indigenous peoples and local communities;
(e)	That actions are consistent with the conservation of natural forests and biological diversity, ensuring that the actions are not used for the conversion of natural forests, but are instead used to incentivize the protection and conservation of natural forests and their ecosystem services, and to enhance other social and environmental benefits;
(f)	Actions to address the risks of reversals;
(g)	Actions to reduce displacement of emissions".

Countries have to regularly provide a summary of information on how these safeguards are addressed and respected. This could come in the form, for instance, of explaining the legal and regulatory environment with regards to the recognition, inclusion and engagement of Indigenous Peoples, and information on how these requirements have been implemented.

Decision 12/CP.19 established that the "summary of information" on the safeguards will be provided in the National Communications to the UNFCCC, which for developing country Parties will be once every four years. Additionally, and on a voluntary basis, the summary of information may be posted on the UNFCCC REDD+ web platform.

Additional issues

All pertinent issues that comprise REDD+ are exclusively those that are included in the decisions of the COP, as indicated in the above sections. There is, however, a large variety of concepts and approaches that are labelled (as being part of) REDD+ by their proponents, either being a substitute for UNFCCC decisions or complementary to those decisions. Below follows a – no doubt incomplete – list of such concepts and approaches.

 Project-based REDD+, voluntary market REDD+. As the concept of REDD+ was being defined, many organizations began promoting REDD+ projects at the scale of a forest area (e.g. large concession, National Park), analogous to AR-CDM projects under the Kyoto Protocol, with reduction of emissions or enhancement of removals vetted by an external organization using a standard established by some party (e.g. CCBA, VCS) and with carbon credits traded on the international voluntary carbon market. However, under the UNFCCC REDD+ is defined as national (Decisions 4/CP.15 and 1/CP.16 consistently refer to national strategies and action plans and national monitoring, with sub-national coverage allowed as an interim measure only).
 Benefit distribution. The UNFCCC decisions on REDD+ are silent on the issue of rewarding countries and participants for their verified net emission reductions or enhanced removals of greenhouse gases. It is not very likely that specific requirements for sub-national implementation of the distribution of benefits will be adopted, as this will be perceived to be an issue of national sovereignty. Generic guidance may be provided, using language similar to that of the safeguards, such as "result-based finance has to accrue to local stakeholders" without being specific on percentages retention for management, identification of stakeholders, type of benefit or means of distribution. Countries may decide to channel any benefits through an existing program on rural development, for instance, provide additional services (e.g. extension, better market access, training, seedlings) or pay local stakeholders directly. Many financial entities do have specific requirement on the design of a system to use funds received, and reporting on the use of these funds.
 FPIC. Free, prior and informed consent is included in the U.N. Declaration on the Rights of Indigenous Peoples. The REDD+ decisions under the UNFCCC do not have this as an explicit requirement; however, the safeguard on respect for the knowledge and rights of indigenous peoples and members of local communities notes "that the United Nations General Assembly has adopted the United Nations Declaration on the Rights of Indigenous Peoples" (UNDRIP). Article 19 of UNDRIP requires that "States shall consult and cooperate in good faith with the indigenous peoples concerned through their own representative institutions in order to obtain their free, prior and informed consent before adopting and implementing legislative or administrative measures that may affect them". This article is interpreted by many organizations engaged in REDD+, for example in the UN-REDD "Guidelines on Free, Prior and Informed Consent," to mean that every, or at least many, communities need to provide their consent before any REDD+ activities can take place.
 Leakage refers to detrimental effects outside of the project area attributable to project activities. Leakage is less of an issue when REDD+ is implemented at a national or subnational level, as there can be no domestic leakage once full national coverage is achieved. However, there can still be international leakage if activities are displaced across international borders, or "displacement of emissions" between sectors, such as replacing wood fires with kerosene stoves (AFOLU to energy) or construction with wood for construction with concrete, cement and bricks (AFOLU to industry). Many initiatives require leakage be taken into account in program design, so that potential leakage of emissions, including across borders, can be minimized.

REDD+ as a climate change mitigation measure 
Deforestation and forest degradation account for 17–29% of global greenhouse gas emissions, the reduction of which is estimated to be one of the most cost-efficient climate change mitigation strategies. Regeneration of forest on degraded or deforested lands can remove CO₂ from the atmosphere through the build-up of biomass, making forest lands a sink of greenhouse gases. The REDD+ mechanism addresses both issues of emission reduction and enhanced removal of greenhouse gases.

Reducing emissions 
Emissions of greenhouse gases from forest land can be reduced by slowing down the rates of deforestation and forest degradation, covered by REDD+ eligible activities. Another option would be some form of reduced impact logging in commercial logging, under the REDD+ eligible activity of sustainable management of forests.

Enhancing removals 
Removals of greenhouse gases (specifically CO₂) from the atmosphere can be achieved through various forest management options, such as replanting degraded or deforested areas or enrichment planting, but also by letting forest land regenerate naturally. Care must be taken to differentiate between what is a purely ecological process of regrowth and what is induced or enhanced through some management intervention.

REDD+ and the carbon market 
In 2009, at COP 15 in Copenhagen, the Copenhagen Accord was reached, noting in section 6 the recognition of the crucial role of REDD and REDD+ and the need to provide positive incentives for such actions by enabling the mobilization of financial resources from developed countries. The Accord goes on to note in section 8 that the collective commitment by developed countries for new and additional resources, including forestry and investments through international institutions, will approach US$30 billion for the period 2010–2012.

The Green Climate Fund (GCF) was established at COP 17 to function as the financial mechanism for the UNFCCC, thereby including REDD+ finance. The Warsaw Framework on REDD-plus makes various references to the GCF, instructing developing country Parties to apply to the GCF for result-based finance. The GCF currently finances REDD+ programs in phase 1 (design of national strategies or action plans, capacity building) and phase 2 (implementation of national strategies or action plans, demonstration programs). It is currently finalizing an approach to REDD+ results-based payments.

REDD+ is also eligible for inclusion under CORSIA, the International Civil Aviation Organization (ICAO)'s market-based greenhouse gas offset mechanism.

Implementing REDD+ 
Decision 1/CP.16, paragraph 73, suggests that national capacity for implementing REDD+ is built up in phases, "beginning with the development of national strategies or action plans, policies and measures, and capacity-building, followed by the implementation of national policies and measures and national strategies or action plans that could involve further capacity-building, technology development and transfer and results-based demonstration activities, and evolving into results-based actions that should be fully measured, reported and verified". The initial phase of the development of national strategies and action plans and capacity building is typically referred to as the "Readiness phase" (a term like Reddiness is also encountered).

There is a very substantial number of REDD+ projects globally and this section lists only a selection. One of the more comprehensive online tools with up-to-date information on REDD+ projects is the Voluntary REDD+ Database.

Readiness activities 
Most REDD+ activities or projects implemented since the call for demonstration activities in Decision 2/CP.13 December 2007 are focused on readiness, which is not surprising given that REDD+ and its requirements were completely new to all developing countries.

 UN-REDD Programme UNDP, UNEP and FAO jointly established the UN-REDD Programme in 2007, a partnership aimed at assisting developing countries in addressing certain measures needed in order to effectively participate in the REDD+ mechanism. These measures include capacity development, governance, engagement of Indigenous Peoples and technical needs. The initial set of supported countries were Bolivia, Democratic Republic of Congo, Indonesia, Panama, Papua New Guinea, Paraguay, Tanzania, Vietnam, and Zambia. By March 2014 the Programme counted 49 participants, 18 of which are receiving financial support to kick start or complement a variety of national REDD+ readiness activities. The other 31 partner countries may receive targeted support and knowledge sharing, be invited to attend meetings and training workshops, have observer status at the Policy Board meetings, and "may be invited to submit a request to receive funding for a National Programme in the future, if selected through a set of criteria to prioritize funding for new countries approved by the Policy Board". The Programme operates in six work areas:
 MRV and Monitoring (led by FAO)
 National REDD+ Governance (UNDP)
 Engagement of Indigenous Peoples, Local Communities and Other Relevant Stakeholders (UNDP)
 Ensuring multiple benefits of forests and REDD+ (UNEP)
 Transparent, Equitable and Accountable Management of REDD+ Payments (UNDP)
 REDD+ as a Catalyst for Transformations to a Green Economy (UNEP)
 Forest Carbon Partnership Facility The World Bank plays an important role in the development of REDD+ activities since its inception. The Forest Carbon Partnership Facility (FCPF) was presented to the international community at COP 13 in Bali, December 2007. Recipient countries can apply $3.6 million towards: the development of national strategies; stakeholder consultation; capacity building; development of reference levels; development of a national forest monitoring system; and social and environmental safeguards analysis. Those countries that successfully achieve a state of readiness can apply to the related Carbon Fund, for support towards national implementation of REDD+.
 Norwegian International Climate and Forest Initiative At the 2007 Bali Conference, the Norwegian government announced their International Climate and Forests Initiative (NICFI), which provided US$1 billion towards the Brazilian REDD scheme and US$500 million towards the creation and implementation of national-based, REDD+ activities in Tanzania. In addition, with the United Kingdom, $200 million was contributed towards the Congo Basin Forest Fund to aid forest conservation activities in Central Africa. In 2010, Norway signed a Letter of Intent with Indonesia to provide the latter country with up to US$1 billion "assuming that Indonesia achieves good results".
"United States" The United States has provided more than $1.5 billion in support for REDD+ and other sustainable landscape activities since 2010. It supports several multilateral partnerships including the FCPF, as well as flagship global programs such as SilvaCarbon, which provides support to REDD+ countries in measuring and monitoring forests and forest-related emissions. The United States also provides significant regional and bilateral support to numerous countries implementing REDD+.
 ITTO The International Tropical Timber Organization (ITTO) has launched a thematic program on REDD+ and environmental services with an initial funding of US$3.5 million from Norway. In addition, the 45th session of the ITTO Council held in November 2009, recommended that efforts relating REDD+ should focus on promoting "sustainable forest management".
 Finland In 2009, the Government of Finland and the Food and Agriculture Organization of the United Nations signed a US$17 million partnership agreement to provide tools and methods for multi-purpose forest inventories, REDD+ monitoring and climate change adaptation in five pilot countries: Ecuador, Peru, Tanzania, Viet Nam and Zambia. As part of this programme, the Government of Tanzania will soon complete the country's first comprehensive forest inventory to assess its forest resources including the size of the carbon stock stored within its forests. A forest soil carbon monitoring program to estimate soil carbon stock, using both survey and modelling-based methods, has also been undertaken.
 Australia Australia established a A$200 million International Forest Carbon Initiative, focused on developing REDD+ activities in its vicinity, i.e., in areas like Indonesia, and Papua New Guinea.
 Interim REDD+ Partnership In 2010, national governments of developing and developed countries joined efforts to create the Interim REDD+ Partnership as means to enhance implementation of early action and foster fast start finance for REDD+ actions.

Implementation phase 
Some countries are already implementing aspects of a national forest monitoring system and activities aimed at reducing emissions and enhancing removals that go beyond REDD+ readiness. For example, the Forest Carbon Partnership Facility has 19 countries in the pipeline of the Carbon Fund, which will provide payments to these countries based on verified REDD+ emissions reductions achieved under national or subnational programs.

Results-based actions 
Following the Warsaw Framework on REDD-plus, the first country had submitted a Biennial Update Report with a Technical Annex containing the details on emission reductions from REDD+ eligible activities. Brazil submitted its first Biennial Update Report on 31 December 2014. The Technical Annex covers the Amazon biome within Brazil's territory, a little under half of the national territory, reporting emission reductions against Brazil's previously submitted reference emission level of 2,971.02 MtCO2e from a reduction in deforestation. This Technical Annex was reviewed through the International Consultation and Analysis process and on 22 September 2015 a technical report was issued by the UNFCCC which states that "the LULUCF experts consider that the data and information provided in the technical annex are transparent, consistent, complete and accurate" (paragraph 38).

(a) Continuation in updating and improving the carbon density map, including through the use of improved ground data from Brazil's first national forest inventory, possibly prioritizing geographic areas where deforestation is more likely to occur;

(b) Expansion of the coverage of carbon pools, including improving the understanding of soil carbon dynamics after the conversion of forests to non-forests;

(c) Consideration of the treatment of non-CO2 gases to maintain consistency with the GHG inventory;

(d) Continuation of the improvements related to monitoring of forest degradation;

(e) Expansion of the forest monitoring system to cover additional biomes.

Concerns 
Since the first discussion on REDD+ in 2005, and particularly at COP 13 in 2007 and COP 15 in 2009, many concerns have been voiced on aspects of REDD+. Though it is widely understood that REDD+ will need to undergo full-scale implementation in all non-Annex I countries to meet the objectives of the Paris Agreement, many challenges need resolving before this can happen.

One of the largest issues is how reduction of emissions and the removal of greenhouse gases will be monitored consistently on a large scale, across a number of countries, each with separate environmental agencies and laws. Other issues relate to the conflict between the REDD+ approach and existing national development strategies, the participation of forest communities and indigenous peoples in the design and maintenance of REDD+, funding for the countries implementing REDD+, and the consistent monitoring of forest resources to detect permanence of the forest resources that have been reported by countries under the REDD+ mechanism.

Natural forests vs. high-density plantations 
Safeguard (e): That actions are consistent with the conservation of natural forests and biological diversity, ensuring that the [REDD+] actions … are not used for the conversion of natural forests, but are instead used to incentivize the protection and conservation of natural forests and their ecosystem services, and to enhance other social and environmental benefits. Footnote to this safeguard: Taking into account the need for sustainable livelihoods of indigenous peoples and local communities and their interdependence on forests in most countries, reflected in the United Nations Declaration on the Rights of Indigenous Peoples, as well as the International Mother Earth Day.

The UNFCCC does not define what constitutes a forest; it only requires that Parties communicate to the UNFCCC on how they define a forest. The UNFCCC does suggest using a definition in terms of minimal area, minimal crown coverage and minimal height at maturity of perennial vegetation.

While there is a safeguard against the conversion of natural forest, developing country Parties are free to include plantations of commercial tree species (including exotics like Eucalyptus spp., Pinus spp., Acacia spp.), agricultural tree crops (e.g. rubber, mango, cocoa, citrus), or even non-tree species such as palms (oil palm, coconut, dates) and bamboo (a grass). Some opponents of REDD+ argue that this lack of a clear distinction is no accident. FAO forest definitions date from 1948 and define forest only by the number, height, and canopy cover of trees in an area.

Similarly, there is a lack of a consistent definition for forest degradation.

A national REDD+ strategy need not refer solely to the establishment of national parks or protected areas; by the careful design of rules and guidelines, REDD+ could include land use practices such as shifting cultivation by indigenous communities and reduced-impact-logging, provided sustainable rotation and harvesting cycles can be demonstrated. Some argue that this is opening the door to logging operations in primary forests, displacement of local populations for "conservation", increase of tree plantations.

Achieving multiple benefits, for example the conservation of biodiversity and ecosystem services (such as drainage basins), and social benefits (for example income and improved forest governance) is currently not addressed, beyond the inclusion in the safeguard.

Land tenure, carbon rights and benefit distribution 
According to some critics, REDD+ is another extension of green capitalism, subjecting the forests and its inhabitants to new ways of expropriation and enclosure at the hands of polluting companies and market speculators. So-called "carbon cowboys" – unscrupulous entrepreneurs who attempt to acquire rights to carbon in rainforest for small-scale projects – have signed on indigenous communities to unfair contracts, often with a view to on-selling the rights to investors for a quick profit. In 2012 an Australian businessman operating in Peru was revealed to have signed 200-year contracts with an Amazon tribe, the Yagua, many members of which are illiterate, giving him a 50 per cent share in their carbon resources. The contracts allow him to establish and control timber projects and palm oil plantations in Yagua rainforest. This risk is largely negated by the focus on national and subnational REDD+ programs, and by government ownership of these initiatives.

There are risks that the local inhabitants and the communities that live in the forests will be bypassed and that they will not be consulted and so they will not actually receive any revenues. Fair distribution of REDD+ benefits will not be achieved without a prior reform in forest governance and more secure tenure systems in many countries.

The UNFCCC has repeatedly called for full and effective participation of Indigenous Peoples and local communities without becoming any more specific. The ability of local communities to effectively contribute to REDD+ field activities and the measurement of forest properties for estimating reduced emissions and enhanced emissions of greenhouse gases has been clearly demonstrated in various countries.

In some project-based REDD+, disreputable companies have taken advantage of low governance.

Indigenous peoples 
Safeguard (c): Respect for the knowledge and rights of indigenous peoples and members of local communities, by taking into account relevant international obligations, national circumstances and laws, and noting that the United Nations General Assembly has adopted the United Nations Declaration on the Rights of Indigenous Peoples;
Safeguard (d): The full and effective participation of relevant stakeholders, in particular indigenous peoples and local communities, in the [REDD+] actions … [and when developing and implementing national strategies or action plans];

Indigenous peoples are important stakeholders in REDD+ as they typically live inside forest areas or have their livelihoods (partially) based on exploitation of forest resources. The International Indigenous Peoples Forum on Climate Change (IIPFCC) was explicit at the Bali climate negotiations in 2007:

REDD/REDD+ will not benefit Indigenous Peoples, but in fact will result in more violations of Indigenous Peoples' rights. It will increase the violation of our human rights, our rights to our lands, territories and resources, steal our land, cause forced evictions, prevent access and threaten indigenous agricultural practices, destroy biodiversity and cultural diversity and cause social conflicts. Under REDD/REDD+, states and carbon traders will take more control over our forests.

Some claim putting a commercial value on forests neglects the spiritual value they hold for Indigenous Peoples and local communities.

Indigenous Peoples protested in 2008 against the United Nations Permanent Forum on Indigenous Issues final report on climate change and a paragraph that endorsed REDD+; this was captured in a video entitled "the 2nd May Revolt". However, these protests have largely disappeared in recent years. Indigenous people sit as permanent representatives on many multinational and national REDD+ bodies.

Indigenous Peoples' groups in Panama broke off their collaboration with the national UN-REDD Programme in 2012 over allegations of a failure of the government to properly respect the rights of the indigenous groups.

Some grassroots organizations are working to develop REDD+ activities with communities and developing benefit-sharing mechanisms to ensure REDD+ funds reach rural communities as well as governments. Examples of these include Plan Vivo projects in Mexico, Mozambique and Cameroon; and Carbonfund.org Foundation's VCS and CCBS projects in the state of Acre, Brazil.

REDD+ in the carbon market 
When REDD+ was first discussed by the UNFCCC, no indication was given of the positive incentives that would support developing countries in their efforts to implement REDD+ to reduce emissions and enhance removals of greenhouse gases from forests. In the absence of guidance from the COP, two options were debated by the international community at large:
 a market-based approach;
 a fund-based approach where Annex I countries would deposit substantial amounts of money into a fund administered by some multi-lateral entity.

Under the market-based approach, REDD+ would act as an "offset scheme" in which verified results-based actions translate into some form of carbon credits, more-or-less analogous to the market for Certified Emission Reductions (CER) under the CDM of the Kyoto Protocol. Such carbon credits could then offset emissions in the country or company of the buyer of the carbon credits. This would require Annex I countries to agree to deeper cuts in emissions of greenhouse gases in order to create a market for the carbon credits from REDD+, which is unlikely to happen soon given the current state of negotiations in the COP, but even then there is the fear that the market will be flooded with carbon credits, depressing the price to levels where REDD+ is no longer an economically viable option. Some developing countries, such as Brazil and China, maintain that developed countries must commit to real emissions reductions, independent of any offset mechanism.

Since COP 17, however, it has become clear that the REDD+ may be financed by a variety of sources, market and non-market. The newly established Green Climate Fund already is supporting phase 1 and 2 REDD+ programs, and is finalizing rules to allow disbursement of result-based finance to developing countries that submit verified reports of emission reductions and enhanced removals of greenhouse gases.

Top-down design by large international institutions vs. bottom-up grassroots coalitions

While the COP decisions emphasize national ownership and stakeholder consultation, there are concerns that some of the larger institutional organizations are driving the process, in particular outside of the one Party, one vote realm of multi-lateral negotiations under the UNFCCC. For example, the World Bank and the UN-REDD Programme, the two largest sources of funding and technical assistance for readiness activities and therefore unavoidable for most developing countries, place requirements upon recipient countries that are arguably not mandated or required by the COP decisions. A body of research suggests that, at least as of 2016, REDD+ as a global architecture has only had a limited effect on local political realities, as pre-existing entrenched power dynamics and incentives that promote deforestation are not easily changed by the relatively small sums of money that REDD+ has delivered to date. In addition, issues like land tenure that fundamentally determine who makes decisions about land use and deforestation have not been adequately addressed by REDD+, and there is no clear consensus on how complex political issues like land tenure can be easily resolved to favor standing forests over cleared forests through a relatively top-down mechanism like REDD+.

While a single, harmonized, global system that accounts for and rewards emissions reductions from forests and land use has been elusive, diverse context-specific projects have emerged that support a variety of activities including community-based forest management, enforcement of protected areas, sustainable charcoal production, and agroforestry. Although it is not clear whether these diverse projects are genuinely different from older integrated conservation and development initiatives that pre-date REDD+, there is evidence that REDD+ has altered global policy conversations, possibly elevating issues like indigenous peoples' land rights to higher levels, or conversely threatening to bypass safeguards for indigenous rights. Debate surrounding these issues is ongoing.

Although the World Bank declares its commitment to fight against climate change, many civil society organisations and grassroots movements around the world view with scepticism the processes being developed under the various carbon funds. Among some of the most worrying reasons are the weak (or inexistent) consultation processes with local communities; the lack of criteria to determine when a country is ready to implement REDD+ projects (readiness); the negative impacts such as deforestation and loss of biodiversity (due to fast agreements and lack of planning); the lack of safeguards to protect Indigenous Peoples' rights; and the lack of regional policies to stop deforestation. A growing coalition of civil society organization, social movement, and other actors critical of REDD+ emerged between 2008 and 2011, criticizing the mechanism on climate justice grounds. During the UN climate negotiations in Copenhagen (2009) and Cancun (2010) strong civil society and social movements coalitions formed a strong front to fight the World Bank out of the climate. However, this concern has largely died down as the World Bank initiatives have been more full developed, and some of these same actors are now participating in implementation of REDD+.

ITTO has been criticized for appearing to support above all the inclusion of forest extraction inside REDD+ under the guise of "sustainable management" in order to benefit from carbon markets while maintaining business-as-usual.

See also 

 Deforestation and climate change
 Deforestation by region
 Emissions trading
 Environmental crime
 Illegal logging
 International Work Group for Indigenous Affairs
 Kyoto Protocol
 CDM excluding Forest Conservation
 Natural Forest Standard
 Participatory monitoring
 Political corruption
 Tree credits
 Tree planting
 United Nations Forum on Forests

References

Further reading

External links
UNFCCC REDD Web Platform
REDD+ Partnership, including financing database
Forest Carbon Partnership Facility, hosted by the World Bank
REDD+ profile on database of Market Governance Mechanisms
UN-REDD Programme
Code REDD: A campaign to promote REDD+ projects and the corporations who have pledged support
REDD-Monitor - Critical analysis and news about REDD

Emissions reduction
Carbon finance
Reforestation
Forest governance
Deforestation
World forestry
Forest certification
Forest conservation
Environmental controversies
Sustainable forest management